Robert or Bob Randall may refer to:

 Robert C. Randall (1948–2001), advocate of medical marijuana, founder of Alliance for Cannabis Therapeutics
 Robert Richard Randall (1750–1801), founder of Sailors' Snug Harbor in Staten Island, New York
 Robert Randall (photographer) (1918–1984), American photographer
 Robert Randall, pseudonym used jointly by American novelists Robert Silverberg (born 1935) and Randall Garrett (1927–1987)
 Bob Randall (Aboriginal Australian elder) (1929–2015), Aboriginal Australian elder, singer and community leader
 Bob Randall (politician), Australian politician in South Australia
 Bob Randall (baseball) (born 1948), American Major League Baseball player, 1976–1980

See also 
 Robert Randal (c. 1766–1834), Canadian businessman and politician